DABUS (Device for the Autonomous Bootstrapping of Unified Sentience) is an artificial intelligence (AI) system created by Stephen Thaler. It reportedly conceived two inventions. The filing of patent applications designating DABUS as inventor has led to decisions by patent offices and courts on whether a patent can be granted for an invention reportedly made by an AI system.

History in different jurisdictions

Australia
On 17 September 2019, Thaler filed an application to patent a "Food container and devices and methods for attracting enhanced attention," naming DABUS as the inventor. On 21 September 2020, IP Australia found that section 15(1) of the Patents Act 1990 (Cth) is inconsistent with an artificial intelligence machine being treated as an inventor, and Thaler's application had lapsed. Thaler sought judicial review, and on 30 July 2021, the Federal Court set aside IP Australia's decision and ordered IP Australia to reconsider the application. On 13 April 2022, the Full Court of the Federal Court set aside that decision, holding that only a natural person can be an inventor for the purposes of the Patents Act 1990 (Cth) and the Patents Regulations 1991 (Cth), and that such an inventor must be identified for any person to be entitled to a grant of a patent. On 11 November 2022, Thaler was refused special leave to appeal to the High Court.

European Patent Office
The European Patent Office (EPO) refused two European patent applications naming DABUS as inventor on similar grounds as in the U.S. (see below). The two EPO decisions are under appeal, as of August 2020.

United Kingdom
Similar applications were filed by Thaler to the United Kingdom Intellectual Property Office on 17 October and 7 November 2018. The Office asked Thaler to file statements of inventorship and of right of grant to a patent (Patent Form 7) in respect of each invention within 16 months of the filing date. Thaler filed those forms naming DABUS as the inventor and explaining in some detail why he believed that machines should be regarded as inventors in the circumstances.

His application was rejected on the grounds that:
(1) naming a machine as inventor did not meet the requirements of the Patents Act 1977; and 
(2) the IPO was not satisfied as to the manner in which Thaler had acquired rights that would otherwise vest in the inventor.
Thaler was not satisfied with the decision and asked for a hearing before an official known as the "hearing officer". By a decision dated 4 December 2019 the hearing officer rejected Thaler's appeal.

Thaler appealed against the hearing officer's decision to the Patents Court (a specialist court within the Chancery Division of the High Court of England and Wales that determines patent disputes).  On 21 September 2020, Mr Justice Marcus Smith upheld the decision of the hearing officer. On 21 September 2021, Thaler's further appeal to the Court of Appeal was dismissed by Arnold LJ and Laing LJ (Birss LJ dissenting).

United States
The patent applications on the inventions were refused by the USPTO, which held that only natural persons can be named as inventors in a patent application. Thaler first fought this result by filing a complaint under Administrative Procedure Act (APA) alleging that the decision was "arbitrary, capricious, an abuse of discretion and not in accordance with the law; unsupported by substantial evidence, and in excess of Defendants’ statutory authority." A month later on August 19, 2019, Thaler filed a petition with the USPTO as allowed in 37 C.F.R. § 1.181 stating that DABUS should be the inventor. The judge and Thaler agreed in this case that Thaler himself is unable to receive the patent on behalf of DABUS.

New Zealand

On the 31st of January 2022, the Intellectual Property Office of New Zealand (IPONZ) decided that a patent application (776029) filed by Stephen Thaler was void, on the basis that no inventor was identified on the patent applications. IPONZ determined that DABUS could not be “an actual devisor of the invention” as required by the Patents Act 2013, and that this must be a natural person as held by the previous patent offices above.

South Africa 
On the 24th of June 2021, the South African Companies and Intellectual Property Commission (CIPC) accepted Dr Thaler's Patent Cooperation Treaty, for a patent in respect of inventions generated by DABUS. In July 2021, the CIPC released a notice of issuance for the patent. It is the first patent granted for an AI invention.

References

Artificial intelligence
Patent law